Senad Lulić (born 18 January 1986) is a Bosnian former professional footballer who played as a midfielder.

Lulić started his professional career at Chur 97, before joining Bellinzona in 2006. Two years later, he switched to Grasshoppers. In 2010, he was transferred to Young Boys. The following year, he moved to Lazio. Lulić made his senior international debut for Bosnia and Herzegovina in 2008, earning over 50 caps until 2017. He represented the nation at their first major championship, the 2014 FIFA World Cup. He is one of very few professional footballers in history from the mountainous region Grisons which is more well-known for its hockey players and ski racers.

Club career

Early career
Lulić started playing football as a kid at his hometown club Chur 97 and made his debut in adult amateur football with the 1st team at the age of 18 in the Swiss 3rd Division on 25th April 2004 in a 5:2 defeat to GC Biaschesi. After successfully completing his apprenticeship as a car mechanic, Lulic received in 2006 by Bosnian-Swiss coach Vladimir Petkovic (former player of Chur 97) an opportunity at Bellinzona in the Swiss 2nd Division. Aged 20, Lulic made his professional debut in a 0:3 defeat against Neuchatel Xamax on 28. July 2006. On 6. April 2008 Lulic played his first Swiss Cup final against FC Basel, losing 1:4. Six weeks later, Bellinzona was promoted to Super League after winning both play-off games against FC St. Gallen and Senad Lulic scoring in both. The next two years, Senad Lulic played at Grasshoppers
 before rejoining his former coach Petkovic for a season at Young Boys.

Lazio
In Summer 2011, Lulic transferred to Lazio for an undisclosed fee where Vladimir Petkovic rejoined him for a third time one year later. He made his competitive debut for the team in UEFA Europa League play-offs against Rabotnički on 18 August. Three weeks later, he made his league debut against Milan. On 23 October, he scored his first goal for Lazio in a triumph over Bologna.

He won his first trophy with the club on 26 May 2013, by beating city rivals Roma in Coppa Italia final. Lulić scored the only goal of the game in 71st minute.

He played his 100th match for the side against Legia Warsaw on 28 November.

In January 2016, he extended his contract until June 2021.

On 16 October 2016, he appeared in his 200th game for the team.

In July 2017, Lulić was named club captain. He won his first title as captain on 13 August, by triumphing over Juventus in 2017 Supercoppa Italiana.

Lulić entered Lazio's top 10 appearance record holders on 29 November 2018, as he played his 294th game for the club against Apollon Limassol.

He played his 300th game for the side and managed to score a goal on 26 December.

On 7 December 2019, he played his 343rd match for Lazio and overtook Aldo Puccinelli as club's 5th all-time appearance maker.

Lulić debuted in UEFA Champions League against Bayern Munich on 23 February 2021.

He announced his retirement from football on 1 June 2022.

International career
In May 2008, Lulić received his first senior call-up to Bosnia and Herzegovina, for a friendly game against Azerbaijan, and debuted in that game on 1 June.

On 7 June 2013, in a 2014 FIFA World Cup qualifier against Latvia, he scored his first senior international goal.

In June 2014, Lulić was named in Bosnia and Herzegovina's squad for 2014 FIFA World Cup, country's first major competition. He made his tournament debut in the opening group match against Argentina on 15 June.

With six assists, he was the best assist provider in UEFA Euro 2016 qualifying, along with Arkadiusz Milik and Vladimír Weiss.

He retired from international football on 29 December 2017.

Style of play
During his career, Lulić has been deployed as a left winger and as a left wing-back. He was noted for his great pace and stamina.

Personal life
Because of the outbreak of Bosnian War, Lulić's family fled from his native Bosnia and Herzegovina and moved to Switzerland. Lulić married his long-time girlfriend Sandra in May 2005. Together they have three children, a daughter named Lea and two sons named Lian and Luca.

Career statistics

Club

International

Scores and results list Bosnia and Herzegovina's goal tally first, score column indicates score after each Lulić goal.

Honours
Lazio
Coppa Italia: 2012–13, 2018–19
Supercoppa Italiana: 2017, 2019

References

External links

1986 births
Living people
Sportspeople from Mostar
Bosniaks of Bosnia and Herzegovina
Bosnia and Herzegovina Muslims
Bosnia and Herzegovina refugees
Bosnia and Herzegovina emigrants to Switzerland
Bosnia and Herzegovina footballers
Bosnia and Herzegovina international footballers
Bosnia and Herzegovina expatriate footballers
Association football midfielders
FC Chur 97 players
AC Bellinzona players
Grasshopper Club Zürich players
BSC Young Boys players
S.S. Lazio players
Swiss Challenge League players
Swiss Super League players
Serie A players
Expatriate footballers in Switzerland
Expatriate footballers in Italy
Bosnia and Herzegovina expatriate sportspeople in Switzerland
Bosnia and Herzegovina expatriate sportspeople in Italy
2014 FIFA World Cup players